Zograf is a historical Macedonian, Bulgarian, Serbian, Russian and Albanian personal appellation, later used as pen name and surname. In the Albanian version is in the form of Zografi. It comes from the Greek word for icon painter (zografos). It may refer to:

Zahari Zograf (1810–1853), Bulgarian painter
Dičo Zograf, Macedonian painter
Dimitar Zograf, Bulgarian painter 
Aleksandar Zograf, Serbian cartoonist
Georgi Veselinov – Zograf, Bulgarian painter 
Nikolay Zograf, Russian biologist
Kostandin and Athanas Zografi, Albanian painters

See also
Zografski

Bulgarian-language surnames
Macedonian-language surnames